Axiom is the ninth studio album by the London-based trip hop band Archive. It was released in May 2014.

Track listing

Personnel 

 Darius Keeler - Keyboards, piano, electric piano, synthesizers, programmer, arrangements, orchestral arrangements, production
 Danny Griffiths - Keyboards, samples, sound effects, programmer, arrangements, production
 Pollard Berrier - Vocals (tracks 1,4,6)
 Dave Pen - Vocals (tracks 3,6), guitar (track 2)
 Maria Quintile - Vocals (track 5)
 Holly Martin - Vocals (tracks 4)
 Steve "Smiley" Barnard - Drums
 Steve Harris - Guitar
 Jonathan Noyce - Bass guitar

Charts

References

2014 albums
Archive (band) albums